Alnus oblongifolia (Arizona alder) is a large alder growing up to , from the southwestern United States and northern Sonora, Mexico. It grows across Arizona into western New Mexico mountain ranges. In central Arizona its range extends across the transition zone to the White Mountains region of eastern Arizona–western New Mexico border.

Besides the range extension from central Arizona, elsewhere in New Mexico it occurs only in scattered mountain range locales. In southern Arizona south of the Mogollon Rim, also in two mountain regions, and in neighboring Sonora in regions at the north of the Sierra Madre Occidental cordillera near Arizona's southeast Madrean Sky Island ranges of sky islands. Isolated mountain locales also occur in a region of southwest Chihuahua and neighboring northwest Durango, part of the eastern Sierra Madre Occidentals.

See also
 Alnus incana

References

External links
 Lady Bird Johnson database
 Flora of North America; RangeMap
 NRCS: USDA Plants Profile
 Interactive Distribution Map of Alnus oblongifolia 

oblongifolia
Flora of Arizona
Flora of New Mexico
Trees of Sonora
Trees of Chihuahua (state)
Trees of Durango
Trees of the Southwestern United States
Trees of the South-Central United States
Flora of the Sierra Madre Occidental